Romans 6 is the sixth chapter of the Epistle to the Romans in the New Testament of the Christian Bible. It is authored by Paul the Apostle, while he was in Corinth in the mid-50s AD, with the help of an amanuensis (secretary), Tertius, who adds his own greeting in Romans 16:22. In this chapter, it is shown that the Christian, in baptism, dies to sin.

Text
The original text was written in Koine Greek. This chapter is divided into 23 verses.

Textual witnesses
Some early manuscripts containing the text of this chapter are:
Papyrus 40 (~AD 250; extant verses 4–5, 16)
Codex Vaticanus (325–350)
Codex Sinaiticus (330–360)
Codex Alexandrinus (400–440)
Codex Ephraemi Rescriptus (~450; complete)
Papyrus 94 (5th/6th century; extant verses 10–13, 19–22)

New Testament references
 Romans 6:1 references Romans 3:8
 Romans 6:3 references Matthew 28:19

The Bearing of Justification by Grace upon a Holy Life
From the beginning of this chapter, Paul addresses the "plausible objection" that Christians should "continue in sin, that grace may abound" (Romans 6:1). In Romans 3:8, Paul had referred to slanderous reports to the effect that believers taught "Let us do evil that good may come". Similar indications can be found in Galatians 5:13, 1 Peter 2:16 and Jude 4.

Paul replies that believers should "certainly not continue in sin, that grace may abound" (Romans 6:2). The phrase  is regularly used by Paul; it is used 10 times in this epistle as well as in his other writings. The Pulpit Commentary describes the phrase as "Paul's usual way of rejecting an idea indignantly". The phrase has been translated in various forms:

'God forbid' (Wycliffe Bible, King James Version and 1599 Geneva Bible)
'By no means' (New International Version)
'Of course not' (New Living Translation)
'Absolutely not' (Holman Christian Standard Bible)
'That's unthinkable' (God's Word Translation)
'Far be the thought' (Darby Bible Translation)
"Let the thought be abhorred' (Matthew Henry's Commentary) 
'I should hope not!' (The Message)

The phrase is also used in the Gospel of Luke's conclusion to the parable of the wicked husbandmen.

Dead to sin but alive to God in Christ (6:1–14)

Verse 4 

Dead to sin but alive to God in Christ (6:15–23)

Verse 23

"Wages": from Greek , referring to 'a soldier's pay or wages', but here to 'the end result of an activity' or  'something back in return' ('payoff').

See also
 Baptism
 Related Bible parts: Matthew 28

References

Bibliography

External links 
 King James Bible - Wikisource
English Translation with Parallel Latin Vulgate
Online Bible at GospelHall.org (ESV, KJV, Darby, American Standard Version, Bible in Basic English)
Multiple bible versions at Bible Gateway (NKJV, NIV, NRSV etc.)

06